Herbert Dimmel (31 August 1894 – 21 October 1980) was an Austrian painter. His work was part of the painting event in the art competition at the 1936 Summer Olympics.

References

1894 births
1980 deaths
20th-century Austrian painters
Austrian male painters
Olympic competitors in art competitions
People from Ried im Innkreis District
20th-century Austrian male artists